On (stylized as ON) is the fifth studio album and second double album by Polish rapper Tau, released on May 26, 2017, on his own record label Bozon Records. It is his third album released after changing his stage name from Medium to Tau.

The album was mostly produced by Polish hip-hop duo soSpecial with additional production of Gibbs and Tau himself, and Anatom, Tau's fellow member of Bozon Records, is the only guest that appears on the album. The album debuted at number 1 on the Polish OLiS chart.

Track listing

See also
 List of number-one albums of 2017 (Poland)

References 

2017 albums
Polish-language albums
Tau albums
Albums produced by Tau
Bozon Records albums